Velimir Gašić (born 10 May 1964) is a Serbian professional basketball coach for Sloboda Užice of the Basketball League of Serbia.

Early life 
Gašić was born in Aleksandrovac, SR Serbia, in 1964, but only a year later he moved to Rijeka, where his father get a job. He finished elementary and high school in Rijeka. earned his bachelor's degree in mechanical engineering from the University of Rijeka in 1986, and he also studied at the Faculty of Sport and Physical Education. He first studied under professor Aleksandar Nikolić at the University of Belgrade, and then graduated in the University of Sarajevo in 1985, at the basketball department.

Coaching career

Youth system 
Gašić began his coaching career in 1984 with Kvarner from Rijeka where he coached cadet and junior team. In 1989, he moved to Belgrade and became a coach of youth teams for Partizan.

Senior teams 
In 1991, Gašić was named an assistant coach for Partizan, under head coach Željko Obradović. In the 1991–92 season, Partizan won the FIBA European League. Later, he coached Kikinda, the Bosnian team Borac Banja Luka, and Radnički Belgrade. In 1999, he moved back to Bosnia and Herzegovina where he was a head coach for Borac Banja Luka and Sloboda Dita Tuzla.

Gašić coached Serbian League teams Vojvodina Srbijagas during the 2006–07 season and Metalac during the first part of the 2010–11 season. In 2012, for the second time Gašić was named an assistant coach for Partizan, under head coach Duško Vujošević. During three seasons with Partizan he won the Adriatic League championship and two Serbian League championships.

On July 13, 2016, Gašić signed to be the head coach of the OKK Sloboda Tuzla. They parted ways in December 2017.

In July 2020, Gašić signed for the Montenegrin team Sutjeska. In March 2022, he parted ways with Sutjeska.

International teams 
Gašić worked with the Serbia and Montenegro youth national teams from 2003 to 2005 and with Serbia youth national teams from 2007 to 2010. He was a head coach of the Serbia and Montenegro men's university team that won the gold medal at the 2005 Summer Universiade in İzmir, Turkey. Also, he was an assistant coach of the Serbia national team at the EuroBasket 2007.

Career achievements 
As a head coach
 Bosnia and Herzegovina League  champion: 1 (with Borac Banja Luka: 1999–2000)
 First League of R Srpska champion: 1 (with Borac Banja Luka: 1995–96)
 Bosnian A1 League champion: 1 (with Sloboda Dita: 2001–02)

As an assistant coach 
 EuroLeague champion: 1 (with Partizan: 1991–92)
 Adriatic League champion: 1 (with Partizan: 2012–13)
 Serbian League champion: 2 (with Partizan: 2012–13, 2013–14)
 Yugoslav League champion: 1 (with Partizan: 1991–92)

References

External links
 Coach Profile at eurobasket.com

1964 births
Living people
KK Borac Banja Luka coaches
KK Metalac coaches
KK Sloboda Tuzla coaches
KK Sloboda Užice coaches
KK Sutjeska coaches
KK Vojvodina Srbijagas coaches
OKK Kikinda coaches
OKK Sloboda Tuzla coaches
BKK Radnički coaches
Serbian men's basketball coaches
Serbian expatriate basketball people in Bosnia and Herzegovina
Serbian expatriate basketball people in Croatia
Serbian expatriate basketball people in Montenegro
Sportspeople from Rijeka
People from Aleksandrovac